A boli (plural: boliw) is a fetish of the Bambara or Malinké of Mali.

Uses and customs 
The boli can be zoomorphic (mostly a buffalo or a zebu) or even sometimes anthropomorphic. The populations of Mali who practice the so-called bamanaya cult, that is to say who indulge in the sacrifices of animals on the boliw and who communicate with the afterlife through masked dancers say they are Bamana.

In the Mandingo religions a boli is an object said "charged", that is to say that by its magic it is able to accomplish extraordinary things, such as to give death, to guess the future, to take possession of someone, etc. The boli, which can also be made up of human or animal placenta, clay, tissue, skin, etc., is itself the symbol of the placenta.

It is considered a living being and contains within it a core that can be either a stone, a metal or any other material. This nucleus or "grain" symbolizes the vital energy. The more blood the boli will receive, the more it will be "charged" with nyama (vital force).

References

Bibliography 
 Graham Harvey, The Handbook of Contemporary Animism, 2014, p.233.

 
African art
Magic (supernatural)
Religious objects
Traditional African medicine